Cedar Run is an  tributary of Pine Creek in Lycoming and Tioga counties, Pennsylvania in the United States.

Cedar Run joins Pine Creek at the community of Cedar Run.

See also
List of rivers of Pennsylvania

References

Rivers of Pennsylvania
Tributaries of Pine Creek (Pennsylvania)
Rivers of Lycoming County, Pennsylvania
Rivers of Tioga County, Pennsylvania